Western Australian soccer clubs competed in 2022 for the Football West State Cup. Perth-based clubs entered from the National Premier Leagues WA, the two divisions of the State League, a limited number of teams from various divisions of the 2022 Amateur League and 2022 Metropolitan League competitions. There were also regional teams from the South West and Great Southern regions.

This knockout competition was won by Cockburn City, their seventh title (five of the first six having been won by the predecessor club Spearwood Dalmatinac).

The competition also served as the Western Australian Preliminary rounds for the 2022 Australia Cup. The two finalists – Armadale SC and Cockburn City – qualified for the final rounds, entering at the Round of 32.

Format

Preliminary rounds

A total of 58 teams took part in the competition, from Perth-based and regional-based competitions.

Final
The 2022 Men's State Cup Final was played at the neutral venue of Inglewood Stadium. Earlier in the day, Perth RedStar won the Women's State Cup.

References

Football West State Cup
WA State Cup